Anthony L. (Tony) Caldwell (born April 1, 1961, in Los Angeles, California) is a former professional American football linebacker in the National Football League. He attended the University of Washington. He would play linebacker with the Los Angeles Raiders from 1983 to 1985, and the Seattle Seahawks in 1987.

External links
Pro-Football reference

1961 births
Living people
Players of American football from Los Angeles
Seattle Seahawks players
Los Angeles Raiders players
Washington Huskies football players
National Football League replacement players